The 1980–81 Segunda División B was the 4th season of Segunda División B, the third highest level of the Spanish football league system, since its establishment in 1977. First and 2nd in each group were promoted to Segunda División, and the bottom three were relegated to the Tercera División.

Group 1

A total of 20 teams will contest the group, including 2 relegated from the Segunda División and 4 promoted from the Tercera División.

Promotion and relegation
Teams relegated from 1979–80 Segunda División
 Celta de Vigo
 Deportivo de La Coruña
Teams promoted from 1979–80 Tercera División
 SD Compostela
 San Sebastián CF
 RSD Alcalá
 Gimnástica Arandina

Teams
Teams from Aragon, Asturias, Basque Country, Canary Islands, Castile and León, Galicia, La Rioja and Madrid.

League table

Results

Top goalscorers

Top goalkeepers

Group 2

A total of 20 teams will contest the group, including 2 relegated from the Segunda División and 4 promoted from the Tercera División.

Promotion and relegation
Teams relegated from 1979–80 Segunda División
 Algeciras CF
 Gimnástico de Tarragona
Teams promoted from 1979–80 Tercera División
 RCD Mallorca
 Cartagena FC
 FC Andorra
 Mérida

Teams
Teams from Andalusia, Andorra, Balearic Islands, Castilla–La Mancha, Catalonia, Extremadura, Region of Murcia and Valencian Community.

League table

Results

Top goalscorers

Top goalkeepers

External links
 RFEF Site

Segunda División B seasons
3
Spain